Clint Eastwood (born Robert Brammer) is a Jamaican reggae deejay, who recorded as a solo artist in the late 1970s and early 1980s before teaming up with UK deejay General Saint as the duo Clint Eastwood & General Saint.

Biography
The younger brother of Trinity, Brammer took the trend of adopting the names of characters from Spaghetti Westerns as stage names a step further by recording and performing under the name of one of the genre's most successful actors, Clint Eastwood. Eastwood recorded three albums in 1978 - African Youth and Step It In a Zion for producer Bunny Lee, and Death In The Arena for Channel One. Further albums followed in 1979 and 1980, including Sex Education for Greensleeves Records, Eastwood one of a group of deejays who led the move from 'cultural' chants to dancehall chat and 'slackness'. 1981 saw the release of a live album recorded with Dillinger and the start of a partnership with General Saint. The duo's first release, "Tribute to General Echo" remembered the recently killed slack deejay, and they would later hit the UK chart with their version of "Stop That Train". Both of the duo's albums made the top 5 of the UK Independent Chart.

Albums
African Youth (1978) Third World/Gorgon
Death In The Arena (1978) Cha Cha
Step It In a Zion (1978) Live & Love
Jah Lights Shining (1979) Jamaica Sound
Love & Happiness (1979) Burning Vibrations
Clint Eastwood (Jamaica Sun) (1980) Amo
Sex Education (1980) Greensleeves
Live at London (1981) Vista (Dillinger & Clint Eastwood)
Two Bad D.J. (1981) Greensleeves (Clint Eastwood & General Saint)
Stop That Train (1983) Greensleeves (Clint Eastwood & General Saint)
BBC Radio 1 In Concert (199?) Windsong (Clint Eastwood & General Saint)
The Best of Clint Eastwood (1984) Culture Press
The Real Clint Eastwood (199?) Culture Press/Lagoon

References

External links
Clint Eastwood at Roots Archives
[ AllMusic biography]

Jamaican reggae musicians
Year of birth missing (living people)
Living people
Cultural depictions of Clint Eastwood
Greensleeves Records artists